Parli may refer to:

Indian place names 
 Parli, Maharashtra, a city and a municipal council in Beed district
 Parli, Rajasthan, a village in the Malpura Tahsil
 Parli (Vidhan Sabha constituency), a legislative assembly in Maharashtra
 Parli-I,  a village in Palakkad district in the state of Kerala
 Parli-II, a village in Palakkad district in the state of Kerala
 Parli (gram panchayat), a local government organisation for the Parli-I and Parli-II villages above

Slang and abbreviations 
 Parliament
 Parliamentary debate (an academic debate event)
 Parliament (cigarette)
 Parli Pro, a shortened name for the National FFA Organization Parliamentary Procedure Career Development Event

See also 
 Parley